Mohammad Naseem, (6 September 1924 – 22 April 2014), was a British Muslim leader and political activist. Nassem worked as a GP before later becoming chairman of the Birmingham Mosque Trust (Birmingham Central Mosque), one of the largest and most prominent Islamic places of worship in the United Kingdom.

Born in Amritsar in British India in September 1924, Naseem was educated mainly in Pakistan and then in England, where he trained to become and worked as a GP for many years and also specialised in the medical procedure of circumcision, particularly for the British Muslim community.

He was executive member of, and home affairs spokesman for, the Islamic Party of Britain.

Naseem was the main practitioner of male circumcision in the region and was based in Aston, Birmingham.

History
In the 1970s, Naseem became involved in the establishment of a major mosque and Islamic centre in Birmingham and supported a project that had begun in the late 1950s but only got underway in the 1960s. There was great confusion at the time and many of those involved had a design for an Islamic institution but disorganisation created a lack of funds and resources to complete the grand and innovative project. Amidst debate and argument, Naseem is said to have joined the members of a loosely formed group and helped to settle disagreements by way of compromise and organisation.

The mosque project was listed as a registered charity and as a limited company and it was decided that elections would be conducted to select an official committee to run the new trust. Naseem was elected chairman and has remained chairman ever since, following an annual vote at the trust's Annual General Meeting.

Leadership

Naseem involve in Student politics in Pakistan during his college era. He was the Nazim-e-Alla of Islami Jamiat Talba during 1951–1952. Naseem has become a familiar face with the Midlands' Muslims and wider faith communities, representing the voice of the region's Islamic community. He appointed the first Muslim female, Wageha Syeda, onto a Shariah Council and Salma Yaqoob, as the only female spokesperson for a British mosque. The mosque has also been the only one in the world to open condolence tributes for non-Muslims after initiating books following the Madrid train bombings and the death of Iraqi hostage Ken Bigley.  This has, however, come under criticism from many more conservative Muslims.

The mosque was accused by some Muslims of imitating the activities of a state-run church but continued with changes including having businesses Asda and Selfridges sponsor and support Ramadan and Eid activities at the mosque.  It is believed many of these innovations were influenced by the presence of Adam Yosef, who served the trust as PR and media officer between 2003 and 2004, during which time many of the widely reported initiatives took place.

Controversy

Comments on the London bombings
Following the 7 July 2005 London bombings, comments made by Naseem criticizing the security services and Metropolitan Police were widely criticized by politicians including MPs Khalid Mahmood and Shadow Home Secretary David Davis. He was also criticized by Mohammed Zaki Badawi, chairman of the Council of Mosques and Imams. He was condemned further after he compared Prime Minister Tony Blair to Adolf Hitler in the same week and has generated national debate over the role of mosque representatives in Britain. When a videotape emerged featuring suspected bomber Mohammad Sidique Khan apparently explaining why he intended to attack British civilians, Naseem said that he suspected the videotape had been doctored:
We are in the 21st century. The cows can be made to look as dancing, the horses can speak like humans, so these things can be doctored or can be produced.

Comments on Birmingham terrorist raids
In February 2007 British police in Birmingham arrested nine suspected terrorists. A few days later Naseem said:

Muslims are persecuted unjustly. The German people were told Jews were a threat. The same is happening here. This is a persecuting course of action that the government has taken. They have invented this perception of a threat. To justify that, they have to maintain incidents to prove something is going on.

He also said that Britain is becoming a police state. Assistant Chief Constable David Shaw responded to Naseem's comments by saying that, "Despite certain labels given to those men by the media, what we are dealing with here in its purest sense is criminality," and Naseem is "wrong".

General Medical Council reprimand
In 2009 Naseem was reprimanded by the General Medical Council for circumcising a baby boy without the parents’ consent. It was also found that he had failed to make an adequate clinical record of the procedure and failed to provide appropriate information about aftercare. The warning was placed on his record for five years. Though this has never been proved accurate, and is largely circumstantial.

Politics

Having unsuccessfully fought the 1994 Bradford South by-election for the Islamic Party of Britain, Naseem also stood as a candidate for RESPECT The Unity Coalition in the 2005 general election, when he challenged the Labour Party seat of Khalid Mahmood MP in Birmingham Perry Barr. He gained over 2,000 votes (5.6%); Labour retained the seat.

Naseem was actively involved in Britain's post-9/11 anti-war movement led by the Stop the War Coalition.

Death
Mohammad Naseem died at Queen Elizabeth Hospital, Birmingham on 22 April 2014, aged 89.

References

1924 births
2014 deaths
British Muslims
British politicians of Pakistani descent
Naturalised citizens of the United Kingdom
Pakistani emigrants to the United Kingdom
Politicians from Amritsar
Respect Party parliamentary candidates